Ericiocyathus is a genus of cnidarians belonging to the family Caryophylliidae.

The species of this genus are found in Southeastern Asia.

Species:
 Ericiocyathus echinatus Cairns & Zibrowius, 1997

References

Caryophylliidae
Scleractinia genera